A benediction is a religious invocation.

Benediction may also refer to:

 "Benediction" (Angel), an episode of Angel
 Benediction (band), a British death metal band
 Benediction (play), a play by Eric Schmiedl
 "Benediction"  (short story), a 1920 short story by F. Scott Fitzgerald
 Benediction (film), a 2021 biographical drama film
 "Benediction", a song by Jars of Clay from the album The Shelter, 2010
 "Benediction", a song by Relient K from their 2000 self-titled debut album

See also 
 Benediction of the Blessed Sacrament, in Roman Catholic and Anglo-Catholic churches, the display of the Eucharist
 Benedictional, a book containing blessings
 Benedictional of St. Æthelwold, an illuminated benedictional from the 10th century
 Benedictive, a grammatical mood in Sanskrit